Lynnhaven Mall is an enclosed super-regional shopping mall in Virginia Beach, Virginia, USA. It opened in August 1981. At  of gross leasable area, it is the largest mall in the Hampton Roads metropolitan area of southeastern Virginia and one of the largest malls on the East Coast. The mall contains more than 180 stores, including Dillard's, JCPenney, and Macy's as main anchor stores. Other stores and junior anchors at the mall include Apple, Barnes & Noble, Dick's Sporting Goods, L.L. Bean, XXI Forever, H&M, and Old Navy. Dave & Busters is also a recent addition to the mall and region. An 18 screen AMC Theatres complex anchors an open-air pedestrian plaza. The mall is managed by Brookfield Properties of Chicago, Illinois.

History
Lynnhaven Mall opened in 1981. The mall was built by Melvin Simon & Associates (now Simon Property Group) of Indianapolis, Indiana, on Lynnhaven Parkway south of Interstate 264 (then State Route 44). The mall originally included six anchor stores: national chains JCPenney and Montgomery Ward, as well as regional chains Rices Nachmans, Thalhimers, Miller & Rhoads and Leggett. Over time, all of the anchors with the exception of JCPenney were changed several times. The first to change was Rices Nachmans, which became Hess's in 1984.

Miller & Rhoads closed in 1990 as part of the chain's bankruptcy, and was converted to Hecht's that year. 

Hess's closed at Lynnhaven Mall on March 30, 1991, as part of a corporate decision to eliminate smaller and underperforming stores. Its location was then sold to the Limited Brands, who converted the space to several of their brands, including The Limited superstore which opened in early 1992. Thalhimers closed in 1992 as well, and became a second Hecht's location. The two Hecht's stores remained until 1998, when the chain built a new location between Dillard's and Montgomery Ward. 

Leggett was sold to Belk in 1997; one year later, the store was transferred to Dillard's as part of a mutual exchange. Dillard's also acquired the former Thalhimers, placing its women's departments in one and men's departments in the other. In addition, Lord & Taylor opened a new location at the mall in 1999 replacing the old Miller & Rhoads/Hecht's.

2000s
Montgomery Ward closed in 2001 with the chain's bankruptcy. Simon sold the mall to General Growth Properties (now Brookfield Properties) of Chicago, Illinois in 2003 for $256.6 million. DSW Shoe Warehouse also opened. Lord & Taylor repositioned and shuttered entirely in 2005. The Montgomery Ward space at the mall was divided among Dick's Sporting Goods, Barnes & Noble and Steve & Barry's between 2003-2005. Dillard's expanded the former Thalhimers/Hecht's and moved into it in 2005 so as to vacate the former Leggett/Belk. That space was then demolished and rebuilt into an outdoor plaza called The Inlet anchored by an AMC Theatres complex.

Hecht's, another nameplate of May Company, was converted to Macy's in 2006 when Federated Department Stores (now Macy's, Inc.) acquired the May Company and converted several May nameplates to the Macy's brand. H&M also opened in a portion of the former Hess's space when The Limited moved to a new location, and Steve & Barry's closed on January 30, 2009 with the company's liquidation and became Furniture Mart in 2010. DSW Shoe Warehouse moved out as well, and was replaced by a Forever 21.

In 2012, Furniture Mart closed and moved elsewhere in the city. In its place, a newcomer to the area, Dave & Busters, opened on July 20, 2013.

At the end of 2013, the mall's carousel, which greeted shoppers at the main entrance for 17 years, was removed to make way for a planned renovation. The renovation, announced in January 2014, added 29,000 square feet to the mall, including a new ground-level food court and an open atrium. The new food court opened October 27, 2014; the same day, the remaining mezzanine was closed for demolition.

Apple opened a brand new store near Sephora in September 2014, marking the second Apple Store to come to the Hampton Roads area (the first being at MacArthur Center which will close in the future). At the same time as the mezzanine was being dismantled, the abandoned Miller & Rhoads/Hecht's/Lord & Taylor anchor was mostly torn down and rebuilt. The space was partitioned into two smaller sections and a public entrance. The public entrance opened in October 2015. L. L. Bean moved into the south half of the rebuilt space and opened on June 10, 2016, and most of the north half is taken up by a Maggie McFly's restaurant (the first outside of Connecticut) that opened in May 2017. With all but one of the connector bridges removed due to the renovations, the upper parking deck was no longer being used effectively, so it was partially demolished from March to June 2016. Only the section in front of JCPenney and its intact bridge remains. The area opened by the demolition has been leveled and reverted to open-air parking.

In 2020, due to the outbreak of the Coronavirus, Lynnhaven Mall changed their hours to 12pm - 7pm. On March 30, 2020, due to the stay-at-home order issued by Virginia Governor Ralph Northam, Lynnhaven Mall closed down services that were deemed "non-essential". The services deemed essential are Dillard's, Barnes & Noble, Pet Go Round, Everclear Eyes Optometry, and Bank of America. Some services are limited to 10 patrons at a time, and Everclear Eyes Optometry are accepting emergency appointments only. As the outbreak eased, more of the mall opened as restrictions began to be relaxed. As of May 2021, with the lifting of mandatory statewide restrictions, the mall has resumed mostly normal operation, albeit with some reduced hours, continued cleaning protocols, and encouragement of social distancing. Retailers within the mall may be more restrictive at their discretion.

References

External links
Lynnhaven Mall official website

Shopping malls in Virginia
Shopping malls established in 1981
Brookfield Properties
Buildings and structures in Virginia Beach, Virginia
1981 establishments in Virginia